In real analysis and approximation theory, the Kolmogorov-Arnold representation theorem (or superposition theorem) states that every multivariate continuous function can be represented as a superposition of the two-argument addition and continuous functions of one variable. It solved a more constrained, yet more general form of Hilbert's thirteenth problem.

The works of Vladimir Arnold and Andrey Kolmogorov established that if f is a multivariate continuous function, then f can be written as a finite composition of continuous functions of a single variable and the binary operation of addition. More specifically,

.

There are proofs with specific constructions.

In a sense, they showed that the only true multivariate function is the sum, since every other function can be written using univariate functions and summing.

History

According to Robert Hecht-Nielsen during the first conference on neural networks:  The Kolmogorov theorem was discovered during a friendly mathematical duel between Kolmogorov and fellow Soviet Mathematician V.I. Arnol'd... Kolmogorov won.

The Kolmogorov–Arnold representation theorem is closely related to Hilbert's 13th problem. In his Paris lecture at the International Congress of Mathematicians in 1900, David Hilbert formulated 23 problems which in his opinion were important for the further development of mathematics. The 13th of these problems dealt with the solution of general equations of higher degrees. It is known that for algebraic equations of degree 4 the solution can be computed by formulae that only contain radicals and arithmetic operations. For higher orders, Galois theory shows us that the solutions of algebraic equations cannot be expressed in terms of basic algebraic operations. It follows from the so called Tschirnhaus transformation that the general algebraic equation 

can be translated to the form . The Tschirnhaus transformation is given by a formula containing only radicals and arithmetic operations and transforms. Therefore, the solution of an algebraic equation of degree   can be represented as a superposition of functions of two variables if  and as a superposition of functions of  variables if . For   the solution is a superposition of arithmetic operations, radicals, and the solution of the equation . 

A further simplification with algebraic transformations seems to be impossible which led to Hilbert's conjecture that "A solution of the general equation of degree 7 cannot be represented as a superposition of continuous functions of two variables". This explains the relation of Hilbert's thirteenth problem to the representation of a higher-dimensional function as superposition of lower-dimensional functions. In this context, it has stimulated many studies in the theory of functions and other related problems by different authors.

Variants
A variant of Kolmogorov's theorem that reduces the number of
outer functions  is due to George Lorentz. He showed in 1962  that the outer functions  can be replaced by a single function .

.

David Sprecher  replaced the inner functions  by one single inner function with an appropriate shift in its argument.

.

Phillip A. Ostrand  generalized the Kolmogorov superposition theorem to compact metric spaces. For  let  be compact metric spaces of finite dimension  and let . Then there exists continuous functions  and continuous functions  such that any continuous function  is representable in the form 

.

Limitations

The theorem does not hold in general for complex multi-variate functions, as discussed here.  Furthermore, the non-smoothness of the inner functions and their "wild behavior" has limited the practical use of the representation, although there is some debate on this.

See also
 Universal approximation theorem

References

Sources
Andrey Kolmogorov, "On the representation of continuous functions of several variables by superpositions of continuous functions of a smaller number of variables", Proceedings of the USSR Academy of Sciences, 108 (1956), pp. 179–182; English translation: Amer. Math. Soc. Transl., 17 (1961), pp. 369–373.
Vladimir Arnold, "On functions of three variables", Proceedings of the USSR Academy of Sciences, 114 (1957), pp. 679–681; English translation: Amer. Math. Soc. Transl., 28 (1963), pp. 51–54.

Further reading
S. Ya. Khavinson, Best Approximation by Linear Superpositions (Approximate Nomography), AMS Translations of Mathematical Monographs (1997)

External links
 A deep machine learning algorithm for construction of the Kolmogorov-Arnold representation.
 Practical way of building Kolmogorov-Arnold model.

Theorems in real analysis
Functions and mappings
Theorems in approximation theory